Time Unlimited is a record label that specializes in the production of trance music based out of Hannover, Germany.

The label was founded and established by Joachim Keil in September 1992. Time Unlimited was the first of the Under Cover Music Group UCMG Germany family of labels. The label was relaunched in 2007 by Marc Steinmeier.

The label was founded to release hi-quality electronic music specializing in hard and progressive trance. Originally distributed by MMS in Germany, later on by Intergroove across Europe.

Home label for a variety of successful trance producers, most notably Bernd Augustinski (Nostrum), but also releasing multiple releases from Andreas Kettenbach (Roughage), Marc Steinmeier (Overcharge & Nuclear Hyde), Michael Kores (Albion), and Roger Beglinger (DJ Energy). The task to define the sound of Time Unlimited today borders on sheer impossibility. Time moves in the realm of electronic Music (trance, progressive house and ambient). Since 2004 is Time Unlimited a part of Daredo labelgroup.

In August 2008, Time Unlimited and the German sample & sound design company Ueberschall launched the "Trance ID 2" remix contest. The winner was guaranteed a release on the Time Unlimited label. The international producers that provided the construction kits on the "Trance ID 2" sample pack included Time Unlimited's Mike Koglin, Marc Steinmeier, Darren Tate, and Mark Pledger.

Artists
 Mike Koglin
 Deep Voices
 Nuclear Hyde
 Blix Cannon
 Marcel Van Eyck
 Thomas Radman

References

External links
 Time Unlimited official webpage
 www.10inch.de/
 Blix Cannon official webpage
 Deep Voices official webpage
 Mike Koglin official webpage
 Ueberschall official webpage

Electronic music record labels
German record labels
Record labels established in 1992